Thatteem Mutteem is a Malayalam-language sitcom that has been broadcast on Mazhavil Manorama from 1 July 2012. The series is one of Malayalam television's oldest and longest-running series, and it is one of the series that has been broadcast since the launch of the Mazhavil Manorama channel. The show stars Manju Pillai, Jayakumar Parameswaran Pillai, Naseer Sankranthi, Sidharth Prabhu, Shara Sherly Samuel Koshy and Sagar Surya in lead roles. In 2014 and 2016, the show won the Kerala State Television Award for the Best Comedy Show.

The show is now on an extended hault since 11 November 2023 and would commence to air by mid 2023.

Premier 
The first season of the show, which premiered in 2011, followed a sitcom format and broadcast every weekend for six years. The show switched to a prime time soap opera format on December 3, 2018, airing Monday through Friday at 9:00 p.m. IST. The show's format was changed to a weekend airing in late 2020.

Death of Lead Actress 
The series was on a temporary hiatus since January 2022 after the lead actress K. P. A. C. Lalitha's falling ill followed by her demise. However, the series resumed airing since April 16, 2022.

Premise

Season 1
The recurring theme is the dispute between Mayavathyamma and her daughter-in-law Mohanavalli, and the struggle of the children and Arjunan to resolve it. Although the daughter-in-law and mother-in-law often get into disagreements followed by a cat and mouse fight, they share mutual respect and love .

Arjunan's best friend, Kamalasanan, Mohanavalli's mother, Komalavalli, and Arjunan's sister, Kokila, pay them frequent visits, causing additional strife and drama in the family.

Season 2
The whole family moves to a new home after having a dispute with the son of the owner of their previous home.

The daughter of the Arjunan' family, Meenakshi is now married to Aadhi Shankaran. Meenakshi found out that Aadhi is a lazy employee and is the son of Pravasi Shankaran, who is a poor NRI owed to many debts, but she kept this a secret and marries him believing that she can change him. She shows the same trait as her mother by having disputes with her mother-in-law, Vasavadatha, the wife of Pravasi Shankaran, who became mentally ill after winning a lottery which put ends to their debts. Despite their hateful relationship, the daughter-in-law and mother-in-law duo loved each other and shared mutual respect.

Meanwhile, Arjunan's millionaire brother Sahadevan, his wife Vidhubala, and his three children, Chinnu, Chikku and Chinnan, arrive from the United States. They are the owners of the house to which Mayavathi and her family belong.

Kannan, the only son of Mohanavalli and Arjunan falls in love with Rosamma, a Christian girl after a series of events that disapproved of the family. But later, for the dowry, they agree to their marriage to pay off a loan taken for Meenakshi's wedding, but the plan fails when Kannan unknowingly informs Rosamma's parents that he wants nothing from them except for their daughter. Meenakshi gives birth to triplets - Kunjumani, Muthumani and Kuttappayi and not so late after, she goes to the UK as a nurse to pay off the loan.

Season 3
Mayavathi Amma, the house's sole breadwinner, has died, leaving Arjunan and Mohanavalli unsure how to maintain the household. In the meantime, Meenakshi has returned from London during the covid period.

Cross-over Episodes 
In 2016 and 2021, the show aired crossover episodes with Marimayam, a situation comedy that airs on the same channel on weekends and depicts numerous painful and amusing scenarios while visiting government organisations. The special episodes were titled "Marithatteem Mayammutteem" and "Thatteem Mayam Mutteem Mayam" in 2016, and "Thatteem Mayam Mutteem Mayam" in 2021, respectively. The Onam celebrations were the backdrop for all of the special episodes.

Cast

Main cast

Recurring cast

Additional Guest(s)
 Kaviyoor Ponnamma as herself, and Krishnan Vakkeel's co-star in a film (Season 1: Ep. 108)
 Vishnu Unnikrishnan as himself (Season 2: Epi 189)
 Bibin George as himself (Season 2: Epi 189)
 K. T. S. Padannayil as Mohanavalli's uncle (Season 1: Ep 276)
 Promy as Subru
 Nitha Promy as Rukku
 Vivek Pillay as Richard Buttenhole 
 Archana Menon as Adv. Kamala, Mohanavalli's friend (Season 1: Episode 306)
 Mintu Maria Vincent as Mrunalini
 Sini Prasad as Annamma Chacko, Arjunan's strict, new boss, Executive Engineer (Season 2: 313,314)
 Sethu Lakshmi as Komalavally, Mohanavally's Mother

Production

Season 1
K. P. A. C. Lalitha and Manju Pillai play the role of the mother-in-law and the daughter-in-law respectively. The mother-in-law outwits her daughter-in-law and is always ready to start a fight with her and the daughter-in-law rises to the occasion. Jayakumar plays Manju's husband who is a government officer unwilling to go to work and who lives on his mother's pension. Their children Kannan and Meenakshi were played by real-life siblings Siddharth and Bhagyalakshmi Prabhu. They were cast after the show creators were impressed by their performance in the reality TV show Veruthe Alla Bharya on Mazhavil Manorama, in which their parents were contestants. Bhagyalakshmi was studying in class 11 when she received the offer, she is a nursing graduate in real-life and in the show too. The children are one of the main attractions in the series as they frequently instigate fights between the two women. Naseer Sankranthi plays the role of Kamalasanan who is the best friend of Mahakavi Arjunan (Arjunan) and old classmate of Sahadevan, who boasts that he will be the Panchayat Member in the upcoming years.

Reception
The series is running successful. Thatteem Mutteem is considered special because the show is recorded using "spot dialogue". This technique creates a natural sound and appearance. The artists behave as in real situations. In addition, the performance is natural and simple and the series is related to the current reality that led to its success.

Awards

References

External links

Malayalam-language television shows
Indian television sitcoms
2010s television soap operas
Mazhavil Manorama original programming